Grand Circus Park station is a public transit station in  Downtown Detroit, Michigan that services both the Detroit People Mover and the QLine. The station takes its name from the adjacent Grand Circus Park.

Detroit People Mover
The station occupies the first two floors of a structure attached to the historic David Whitney Building.  It is located at the intersection of Park Street and Woodward Avenue near Washington Boulevard, in the Grand Circus Park Historic District. Accessible by stairway only after the David Whitney Building closed in 1999, the station underwent a major renovation between August 2014 and June 2015 to make it ADA-compliant, to coincide with the reopening of the David Whitney as an Aloft hotel and apartments.

QLine

The station has a transfer to the QLine light rail outside along Woodward Ave. The QLine station is heated and features security cameras and emergency phones. Passenger amenities include Wi-Fi and arrival signs. The QLine portion of the station is sponsored by General Motors' Chevrolet brand.

Destinations
The Grand Circus Park station serves:
 Ford Field (home to the NFL's Lions)
 Comerica Park (home to the MLB's Tigers)
 Detroit Opera House 
 The Fillmore Detroit
 Fox Theatre
 Grand Circus Park

See also

 List of rapid transit systems
 List of United States rapid transit systems by ridership
 Metromover
 Streetcars in North America
 Transportation in metropolitan Detroit

References

External links
 Detroit People Mover: Grand Circus Park station overview
 entrance from Google Maps Street View

Detroit People Mover stations
Tram stops of QLine
Railway stations in the United States opened in 1987
1987 establishments in Michigan